The Kongsat people are an ethnic group in Laos.

Geographic distribution
 Population of approximately 100 in Oudomxai Province of Laos (They inhabit the single village of Nam Nyon Village in Namo District)

Origin
The Kongsat claim that they originated in the Yunnan Province of China.  They are a Tai ethnic group.

Culture
The Kongsat have largely assimilated Lao and Lu customs.

Language
The Kongsat are multilingual in Yang, Lao, Lue, Khmu, Pounyot.

Religion
The Kongsat practice animism.

Celebrations
 Celebration of the Tiger (Day of the Tiger according to the traditional 13-day calendar)
 New Year (celebrated on the 7th day of the first lunar month)
 Birth ceremonies
 House construction ceremonies

References

Ethnic groups in Laos